Jacob Simonis (16 November 1890 – 22 December 1962) was a Dutch wrestler. He competed in the men's Greco-Roman heavyweight at the 1928 Summer Olympics.

References

External links
 

1890 births
1962 deaths
Dutch male sport wrestlers
Olympic wrestlers of the Netherlands
Wrestlers at the 1928 Summer Olympics
Sportspeople from Amsterdam